The 2017 6 Metre World Cup was held in Vancouver, Canada 17–21 September 2017 hosted by Royal Vancouver Yacht Club. Phillippe Durr won the World Championship title.

Results

Open division

Classic division

References

6 Metre World Cup
6 Metre World Cup
Sailing competitions in Canada
2017 in Canadian sports